Alireza Niknazar (born 2 February 1984 in Rasht) is an Iranian football player of Mes Kerman. He usually plays at defender position.

Club career statistics
He played all his career for his hometown teams Pegah and Damash except one season (2009–10) at Nassaji.

Career statistics

References

Iran Premier League Stats

External links

1984 births
Living people
Iranian footballers
Malavan players
Damash Gilan players
Pegah Gilan players
People from Rasht
Nassaji Mazandaran players
Association football defenders
Sportspeople from Gilan province